Kilcandra (Cill Chainre in Irish meaning 'the church of Cainder') is the name of a townsland in the Barony of Arklow and the Civil Parish of Dunganstown in County Wicklow. It is believed to be the site of an early Christian church or monastic site which was dedicated to or founded by a female saint named Cainder.

This townsland is not to be confused with a second Kilcandra also in Co. Wicklow

References